Urganlı is a village in the Batman District of Batman Province in Turkey. The village is populated by Kurds of the Reman tribe and had a population of 251 in 2021.

References 

Villages in Batman District
Kurdish settlements in Batman Province